Joe Letz is an American drummer and DJ best known as the former drummer for the electro-industrial band Combichrist. Letz has also drummed for Amen, Mortiis, horror punk band Wednesday 13, Genitorturers, Hanzel und Gretyl, Imperative Reaction, Emigrate, and Aesthetic Perfection. 
Letz DJs in his downtime between tours and supported Rammstein as a DJ on their US Tour in 2012. He has also remixed the song Sinematic for the American gothic metalcore band Motionless in White.

References

External links 
 
 Tour Blog via VampireFreaks

1980 births
American DJs
American heavy metal drummers
American industrial musicians
American punk rock drummers
American rock drummers
Horror punk musicians
Living people
Musicians from New York (state)
Musicians from New York City
Emigrate (band) members
Amen (American band) members
Genitorturers members
Combichrist members
21st-century American drummers
Black Light Burns members
Pigface members